The Lord Rector of The University of Edinburgh is elected every three years by the students and staff at The University of Edinburgh. Seldom referred to as Lord Rector, the incumbent is more commonly known just as the Rector.

Role 

The Rector chairs the University's highest governing body, the University Court; in addition the Rector chairs meetings of the General Council in the absence of the Chancellor. In more recent years the role has included a function akin to that of an ombudsperson for the university community. In their position, the Rector can exert considerable influence in Court and in the body politic of the University. They can be well-informed about student and staff issues and concerns, can champion their causes, and can make sure that these issues are fully aired in Court.

History 

The position of Rector, along with the positions of Chancellor and Vice-Chancellor, was only created in 1858. Prior to this, the University was governed by the Lord Provost, Magistrates, and town council of Edinburgh.
The rector's place in the university was codified by statute of the Westminster Parliament, the Universities (Scotland) Act 1889, which provided for the election of a Rector at all universities then in existence in Scotland.  To this day only the ancient universities of Edinburgh, Glasgow, Aberdeen and St Andrews plus the newer Dundee, elect a Rector; the 20th century universities do not.

In 1935 students went to great lengths to invite Russian revolutionary Leon Trotsky to become Rector,  Trotsky turned down the offer stating: "The elections to the rectorate are conducted on a non-political basis and your letter itself is signed by representatives of every political tendency. But I myself occupy too definite a political position. … [I could not] appear on any public tribune not under the Bolshevik banner."

Successful candidates are typically well-known figures with some connection to the city. Gordon Brown was unusual in being elected at the age of 21 while still a student, several years before he became politically prominent.

List of rectors

Rectors in the 17th century
The post of Rector was separated from that of Principal in 1620.

1620 Andrew Ramsay (1st term, resigned 1626)
1627 Sir Alexander Morison
1631 Vacant
1640 Alexander Henderson
1646 Andrew Ramsay (2nd term, ejected 1648)
1649 Robert Douglas

In 1665, the Town Council of Edinburgh resolved that the role of Rector should rest thereafter with the Lord Provost of Edinburgh.

(The then Lord Provost was Andrew Ramsay, son of Andrew Ramsay, who had served twice as rector.)

Rectors since the Universities (Scotland Act) 1858
The position of rector was recreated by the Universities (Scotland Act) 1858. Rectors of the university have been:

1859 William Ewart Gladstone 
1865 Thomas Carlyle
1868 Sir James Moncreiff 
1871 Sir William Stirling-Maxwell 
1874 The Earl of Derby
1877 The Marquess of Hartington 
1880 The Earl of Rosebery
1883 Sir Stafford Northcote  (from 1885 Earl of Iddesleigh)
1887 The Marquess of Lothian
1890 George Goschen 
1893 James Robertson 
1896 The Lord Balfour of Burleigh
1899 The Marquess of Dufferin and Ava
1902 Sir Robert Finlay 
1905 Richard Haldane 
1908 George Wyndham 
1911 The Earl of Minto
1914 Field Marshal The Earl Kitchener
1917 Admiral Sir David Beatty (promoted Admiral of the Fleet in May 1919 and created Earl Beatty in Oct. 1919).
1920 David Lloyd George 
1923 Stanley Baldwin 
1926 Sir John Gilmour 
1929 Winston Churchill 
1932 General Sir Ian Hamilton
1935 Field Marshal The 1st Viscount Allenby
1936 Sir H. J. C. Grierson
1939 Sir John Donald Pollock
1945 Admiral of the Fleet The Viscount Cunningham of Hyndhope
1948 Alastair Sim
1951 Sir Alexander Fleming
1954 Sir Sydney A. Smith
1957 James Robertson Justice
1960 Jo Grimond 
1963 James Robertson Justice
1966 Malcolm Muggeridge (resigned 1968)
1968 Kenneth Allsop
1971 Jonathan W. G. Wills
1972 Gordon Brown
1975 Magnus Magnusson
1979 Fr. Anthony Ross
1982 David Steel 
1985 Archie Macpherson
1988 Muriel Gray
1991 Donnie Munro
1994 Malcolm Macleod
1997 John Mark Colquhoun
2000 Robin Harper 
2003 Sir Tam Dalyell 
2006 Mark Ballard 
2009 Iain Macwhirter
2012 Peter McColl
2015 Steve Morrison
2018 Ann Henderson
2021 Debora Kayembe

References

External links 
 
 Interview with Gordon Brown as Rector

Bibliography

 
Edinburgh
Edinburgh